Union Sportive de La Possession, was a football club from La Possession, Réunion Island, which merged 2008 with AJS Possession to form AS Possession.

The club in the French football structure
French Cup : 1 appearance
 1993/94
won tie:  1993/94 US Possession 2–1 SCO Roubaix [aet] (rd 7)

Notes

Possession
Association football clubs established in 1955
1955 establishments in Réunion
Association football clubs disestablished in 2008